Telecommunications in Armenia involves the availability and use of electronic devices and services, such as the telephone, television, radio or computer, for the purpose of communication. The various telecommunications systems found and used in Armenia includes radio, television, fixed and mobile telephones, and the internet.

Mobile
As of 2017, Armenia has 3.5 million mobile subscribers in total, and a 120% penetration rate.

There are three mobile phone operators currently in Armenia: Viva Cell MTS, Ucom and Beeline. All three offer both 2G and 3G as well as 4G services. All three networks are widely modern and reliable with shops located in major towns and cities where one can purchase a sim card or get assistance if needed. Most unlocked mobile phones are able to be used on roaming however network charges apply. Ucom and Viva Cell MTS are often recommended to tourists due to the variety of tariffs available and the help available in a variety of languages.

As of 2012, approximately 90% of all main lines are digitized and provide excellent quality services for the region. The remaining 10% is in modernization process.

International system
Yerevan is connected to the Trans-Asia-Europe fiber-optic cable via Georgia. Additional international service is available by microwave radio relay and landline connections to other countries of the Commonwealth of Independent States, the Moscow international switch and by satellite.
The main backbones of Armenian networks are made by E3 or STM-1 lines via microwave units across whole country with many passive retranslations.

Wire telephone services 
Traditionally, Armenia has well-developed landline telephone services. According to official statistic data of the International Telecommunication Union, as of 2017 there were 505,190 fixed telephone service subscribers in Armenia (residents and businesses) or 17.24 subscribers per 100 inhabitants. The number of fixed telephone users have significantly declined as compared with the previous 10 years from 20.41 in 2006. The main reason for the decline is mobile-fixed substitution.

Radio

As of 2008, Armenia has 9 AM stations, 17 FM stations, and one shortwave station. Additionally, there are approximately 850,000 radios in existence.
The primary network provider is TRBNA.

Television

Armenia has 48 private television stations alongside 2 public networks with major Russian channels widely available throughout the country. In 2008, TRBNA upgraded the main circuit to a digital distribution system based on DVB-IP and MPEG2 standards. According to the Television Association Committee of Armenia, TV penetration rate is 80% according to 2011 data.

Internet
There are approximately 1,400,000 Internet users and approximately 65,279 Internet hosts in Armenia. The country code (Top level domain) for Armenia is .am, which has been used for AM radio stations and for domain hacks.

The national communications company Armentel's only fiber optic connection to the Internet enters Armenia through Georgia (via Marneuli) and then connects to the rest of the Internet via an undersea fiber-optic cable in the Black Sea. Armenia is connected to the Trans-Asia-Europe fiber-optic cable system via Georgia, which runs along the railroad from Poti to Tbilisi to the Armenian border near Marneuli.  At Poti, the TAE cable connects to the undersea Georgia-Russia system KAFOS which then connects to the Black Sea Fiber Optic Cable System.  The BSFOCS is co-owned by Armentel.
GNC-Alfa is the largest independent internet and data provider in Armenia with 1,500 km fibre-optic cable infrastructure, and covering 70% of Armenia.

Dial-up
Dial-up was a main type of connectivity until 2008 when Telecom Armenia CJSC (Beeline TM) started operation of ADSL network and together with Vivacell MTS and Orange Armenia also introduced portable USB-modems, which are operated mainly in 3G networks and are still very popular in rural areas especially in small mountainous villages where landline connectivity is not available.

Broadband
According to official statistics from the International Telecommunication Union, the number of broadband subscribers in Armenia in 2017 was 315,319 users or 10.76 users per 100 persons.

ADSL
A major part of DSL connectivity is offered by Telecom Armenia CJSC (Beeline TM). Some other ISP (Arminco, WEB, Bionet and others) also offer DSL connectivities mainly using leased infrastructure of Telecom Armenia CJSC.

WiMAX
Rapid development of WiMAX was recorded in 2008–2010. Two WiMAX providers, namely Icon Communications and Cornet Ltd. operating in the 3.6–3.8 GHz band using IEEE 802.16e reached 2000 users each, but shortly disappeared from the market due to strong competition with ADSL and FTTB operators. Cornet was closed and Icon Communications was acquired by Telecom Armenia CJSC (Beeline).

FTTB
Fibre to the building broadband connectivity is offered by at least four major operators, namely MTS Armenia (operated by Viva-MTS TM), Ucom, Telecom Armenia CJSC (operated under Beeline TM) and GNC-Alfa (operated under Rostelecom TM). All three companies offer triple play services including Internet, IPTV and telephone services.

Internet censorship
Listed as engaged in substantial filtering in the political area and selective filtering in the social, conflict/security, and internet tools areas by the OpenNet Initiative (ONI) in November 2010.

Access to the internet in Armenia is largely unfettered, although evidence of second and third-generation filtering is mounting. Armenia's political climate is volatile and largely unpredictable. In times of political unrest, the government has not hesitated to put in place restrictions on the internet as a means to curtail public protest and discontent. According to Article 11 of the Law of the Republic of Armenia on Police, law enforcement has the right to block content to prevent criminal activity.

Armenia's internet access is delivered by Russian providers, occasionally resulting in censorship by Russian ISPs. In 2012 Russian authorities blocked kavkazcenter.com, resulting in it being blocked in Armenia. In 2014 five other websites were blocked due to filtering by the Russian telecommunications regulator Roskomnadzor. ISPs claimed the blocks were due to technical error and were removed.

2011 Armenian internet outage
The 2011 Armenian internet outage occurred in April 2011 when an elderly woman from Georgia accidentally cut through an underground cable giving internet access to Armenia.

International cooperation 
Armenia is a member of the European Telecommunications Satellite Organization, the International Telecommunications Satellite Organization, the International Telecommunication Union, and the International Amateur Radio Union.

Armenia has also ratified the Convention on Cybercrime and the Constitution and Convention of the International Telecommunication Union.

See also 

 ArmCosmos
 Media of Armenia
 Ministry of Transport and Communication (Armenia)

References

External links
 :ru:Список интернет-провайдеров Армении List of Internet providers in Armenia, Russian
 Krikorian, Onnik: "Internet in Armenia: Slow, Expensive, but Increasingly Important" in the Caucasus Analytical Digest No. 15
 Porsughyan, Arpine: "Traditional Failings versus Non-Traditional Prospects of the Armenian Media" in the Caucasus Analytical Digest No. 25

 
Internet in Armenia